High Court Building may refer to:
Auckland High Court
Old High Court Building, Dhaka
High Court Building (Hong Kong)
High Court Building (Yangon)
High Court of Australia Building